Saxilby railway station serves Saxilby in Lincolnshire, England. It was built by The Great Northern Railway and opened in 1849.

Facilities
The station has two platforms connected by a ramped footbridge over the line, which opened in the summer of 2014. Before the footbridge was built, the platforms were linked by a surface crossing.

The station house has been converted for private use – a private dwelling and an office. The station is now unstaffed; all tickets must be obtained from the inspector on the train, as there are no ticket machines at the station.

Facilities are limited to shelters on each platform and a help point and departure board for passenger enquiries and information about oncoming trains. There is bicycle storage and a small car park.

Services
Services at Saxilby are operated by Northern Trains and East Midlands Railway.

There are no Sunday services to Doncaster or Peterborough.

References

External links

Railway stations in Lincolnshire
DfT Category F1 stations
Former Great Northern and Great Eastern Joint Railway stations
Railway stations in Great Britain opened in 1849
Railway stations served by East Midlands Railway
Northern franchise railway stations
1849 establishments in England